macOS Monterey (version 12) is the eighteenth major release of macOS, Apple's desktop operating system for Macintosh computers. The successor to macOS Big Sur, it was announced at WWDC 2021 on June 7, 2021, and released on October 25, 2021. macOS Monterey was succeeded by macOS Ventura, which was released on October 24, 2022.

The operating system is named after Monterey Bay, continuing the trend of releases named after California locations since 2013's 10.9 Mavericks.

Changes 
Monterey introduced several new features and changes, including the following:

Shortcuts for the Mac
TestFlight for the Mac
Provisions to allow the planned introduction of Universal Control, which allows a single keyboard and mouse to control multiple Macs and iPads. It works on Macs with Apple silicon and some with an Intel processor, including MacBook Pro (2016 and later), MacBook (2016 and later), MacBook Air (2018 and later), iMac (2017 and later), iMac (5K Retina, 27-inch, Late 2015), iMac Pro, Mac Mini (2018 and later), and Mac Pro (2019). It works on these iPads: iPad Pro, iPad Air (3rd generation and later), iPad (6th generation and later), and iPad Mini (5th generation and later).
Support for the Apple Music Voice Plan Subscription.
Portrait Mode and Noise Cancellation features for FaceTime and some apps (in Control Center).
New Toolbar Features/Designs for Finder and the Preview app.
Have a Live Memoji and Animoji right on the lock screen.
A yellow privacy indicator on the menu bar for indicating if the Mac's microphone or camera is active.
Live Text, which allows a user to copy, paste, translate and lookup text from images displayed by Photos, Screenshot, Quick Look, and Safari. 
New Passwords Manager for Mac
New on-device machine learning-activated keyboard dictation using Siri, and also now for almost unlimited duration.
Low Power Mode for Mac that enables longer battery life for lightweight workflows such as reading PDFs, Web browsing, listening to music, etc. This works on MacBook Air (2018 and later) and MacBook Pro (2016 and later).
 A redesigned optional compact interface for the Safari browser.
 Support for playing AirPlay content streamed from recent iOS and iPadOS devices and Macs, including MacBook Pro (2018 and later), MacBook Air (2018 and later), iMac (2019 and later), iMac Pro (2017), Mac Mini (M1, 2020 and later), Mac Pro (2019), iPhone 6s and later, iPad Pro (2nd generation and later), iPad Air (3rd generation and later), iPad (6th generation and later), and iPad Mini (5th generation and later). Older iPhone, iPad, and Mac models may share content at a lower resolution to supported Mac models when "Allow AirPlay for" is set to "Everyone" or "Anyone on the same network" in Sharing preferences.
 Improvements to FaceTime, including the ability to share a screen and the SharePlay function that enables multiple users to watch or listen simultaneously and in sync (e.g., to music or TV shows).
 The ability to factory reset the Mac from the System Preferences app.
 Visual Look Up makes it easy to identify objects (e.g. cat breeds, dog breeds, etc.) found within user's photos.
 Focus to set different modes to filter notifications across iPhones, iPads and Macs.
 The Time Machine backup functionality excludes more system files.
 Provisions to allow the planned introduction of "Expanded Protections for Children," which will apply cryptography to detect and help limit the spread of child sexual abuse material (CSAM) online by scanning the user's iCloud photos.
 Accessibility option to change the mouse pointer's colors.
 Tips notifications.
The removal of a previously bundled PHP interpreter.
The removal of a previously bundled Python 2.7 interpreter (from 12.3)
 The removal of the ability to use custom Quartz Composer filters and plugins in Photo Booth.
 networkQuality, a command-line tool for measuring upload/download capacity, upload/download flows, and upload/download responsiveness
 An automatically populated "Games" folder within launchpad 
 Support for ProMotion in new 2021 MacBook Pro
 New Object Capture API for creating 3D models using images

Applications

Notes 
In the Notes application, users can now apply arbitrary tags to a note (e.g., #cooking, #work); groups of notes with a given tag or tags can be viewed in Smart Folders or a Tag Browser in the sidebar. The new Quick Notes function enables a user to create a note from within any app via system-wide keyboard shortcut or hot corner.

Maps
Apple Maps adds a 3D globe, with increased mountain, desert, and forest detail.

Messages
Messages supports new features, also introduced in iOS 15, such as "Shared with You" which provides shortcut links to content shared via Messages in other Apple apps such as Safari, Photos, Music, and News.
When multiple photos are sent/received, they are now displayed as a collection instead of multiple messages. A download button is provided to download all photos simultaneously.

Known problems 
Users and developers have reported:
 Laptops unable to boot (fixed with 12.0.1 update)
 Inability to charge sleeping laptops with MagSafe (fixed with 12.1 update)
 Mouse pointer memory leak issue (fixed with 12.1 update)
 Audio issue with speaker and audio output crackling and popping
 Problems connecting external displays to Mac using any version of Monterey
 Unicode Hex Input does not work if the code point number is 0xx0 (first and last digits are zero)

Supported hardware 

macOS Monterey drops support for various Macs released from 2013 to 2015, including all Macs with Nvidia GPUs. When Monterey was released, it supported the following Macs:

 iMac (Late 2015 or later)
 iMac Pro
 MacBook (Early 2016 or later)
 MacBook Air (Early 2015 or later)
 MacBook Pro (Early 2015 or later)
 Mac Mini (Late 2014 or later)
 Mac Pro (Late 2013 or later)

Macs that were released after Monterey was released, with Monterey as the initial operating major release, are:

 Mac Studio (2022)

By using patch tools, macOS Monterey can be installed on earlier computers that are officially unsupported, such as the 2014 iMac and the 2013 MacBook Pro. Using these methods, it is possible to install macOS Monterey on computers as old as a 2008 MacBook Pro and iMac and 2009 Mac Mini.

Release history 

See Apple's main pages for Monterey release notes: for consumers and for enterprise, as well as their current security content page.

Timeline of Mac operating systems

References

External links
  – official site

2021 software
ARM operating systems
Computer-related introductions in 2021
17
X86-64 operating systems